Nite City is the eponymous self-titled debut studio album by the American rock band Nite City. It was released in 1977 on the 20th century records label.

Track listing
All songs written by Noah James and Ray Manzarek, unless otherwise noted.

 "Summer Eyes" - 4:26
 "Nite City" (Lee Huxley, Noah James, Ray Manzarek) - 4:55
 "Love Will Make You Mellow" - 4:50
 "Angel W/ No Freedom" (Danny Sugerman, Noah James, Ray Manzarek) - 6:39
 "Midnight Queen" (Danny Sugerman, Noah James, Ray Manzarek) - 3:55
 "Bitter Sky Blue" - 3:12
 "Caught in a Panic" - 4:41
 "In the Pyramid" (Paul Warren, Ray Manzarek) - 3:48
 "Game of Skill" (Noah James, Paul Warren, Ray Manzarek) - 4:40

Personnel
Nite City
 Noah James - vocals
 Paul Warren - guitar, vocals
 Nigel Harrison - bass
 Ray Manzarek - keyboards, vocals, producer
 Jimmy Hunter - drums, vocals

Production
 Zox - art direction and illustration
 Leonard Kovner - mixing engineer
 Todd Gray - photography
 Roger Dollarhide - recording engineer
 Clyde Terry - typography
 Jay Senter - producer

References

1977 debut albums
Nite City albums
Albums produced by Ray Manzarek
20th Century Fox Records albums